The Best of Holly Cole is a compilation album by Holly Cole. It was released in the US in 2000 on Blue Note Records.

Track listing

 "Trust in Me" (Sherman) – 3:24
 "Calling You" (Telson) – 4:40
 "God Will" (Lovett) – 3:12
 "Blame It on My Youth" (Heyman, Levant) – 3:02
 "I Can See Clearly Now" (Johnny Nash) – 4:14
 "Don't Let the Teardrops Rust Your Shining Heart" (Watt) – 4:20
 "Cry (If You Want To)" (Scott) – 2:38
 "Jersey Girl" (Tom Waits) – 3:46
 "Train Song [live]" (Waits) – 3:33
 "I Want You" (Waits) – 2:58
 "Make It Go Away" (Davis, Harding) – 4:01
 "I've Just Seen a Face" (John Lennon, Paul McCartney) – 3:29
 "Alison" (Elvis Costello) – 3:23

References

Holly Cole albums
2000 greatest hits albums